Azam Khan (Sindhi and ; born 10 August 1998) is a Pakistani cricketer who plays for Islamabad United and Sindh. 

He made his international debut for the Pakistan cricket team in July 2021.

Known as a power-hitter, he considers West Indies player Chris Gayle to be his batting role-model.

Personal life
He's the son of former Pakistani international cricketer Moin Khan.

His brother Owais Khan is married to actress Mariam Ansari.

Often criticized for his fitness standards, before the beginning of the PSL 2020 he trained with Shehzar Mohammad for some four months, losing 14kg in the process.

He's a fan of MMA, which he credits for the way he now handles fast-bowling, as previously he was perceived to be unable to play genuine pace.

He sings and plays the guitar, having learned it by himself through YouTube as a way to de-stress before matches, and has covered well-known songs, including a Bollywood title and Atif Aslam's Aadat.

Domestic career
In September 2018, he made his List A debut for Pakistan Television in the 2018–19 Quaid-e-Azam One Day Cup. 

In March 2019, he made his Twenty20 debut for the Quetta Gladiators in the 2019 Pakistan Super League. 

In October 2020, he was drafted by the Galle Gladiators for the inaugural edition of the Lanka Premier League.

In December 2020, he made his first-class debut for Sindh in the 2020–21 Quaid-e-Azam Trophy.

In August 2021, he was named in the Barbados Royals' squad for the 2021 Caribbean Premier League.

In December 2021, he was signed by Islamabad United following the players' draft for the 2022 Pakistan Super League. 

In July 2022, he was signed by the Galle Gladiators for the third edition of the Lanka Premier League.

In November 2022, he was signed by the Khulna Tigers, to play for them in the 2022–23 Bangladesh Premier League. In the sixth match of the league, he hit his maiden century in T20 cricket, scoring an unbeaten 109 runs off 58 balls.

International career 
In June 2021, Khan was named in Pakistan's Twenty20 International (T20I) squads for their tour of England and the West Indies. He made his T20I debut, which would also be his international debut, for Pakistan during that tour, playing against England. 

In September 2021, he was named in Pakistan's squad for the 2021 ICC Men's T20 World Cup. However, the following month, he was replaced in the squad by Sarfaraz Ahmed.

Television

References

External links
 
 Azam Khan at Pakistan Cricket Board

1998 births
Living people
Pakistani cricketers
Pakistan Twenty20 International cricketers
Pakistan Television cricketers
Quetta Gladiators cricketers
Galle Gladiators cricketers
Sindh cricketers
Islamabad United cricketers